Pseudomonas sesami is a species of pseudomonad bacteria originally isolated from sesame (Sesamum indicum).

References

Pseudomonadales
Bacteria described in 2017